David Howard Levy (born May 22, 1948) is a Canadian amateur astronomer, science writer and discoverer of comets and minor planets, who co-discovered Comet Shoemaker–Levy 9 in 1993, which collided with the planet Jupiter in 1994.

Biography 

Levy was born in Montreal, Quebec, Canada, in 1948. He developed an interest in astronomy at an early age. However, he pursued and received bachelor's and master's degrees in English literature.

Levy went on to discover 23 comets, either independently or with Gene and Carolyn Shoemaker. He has written 34 books, mostly on astronomical subjects, such as The Quest for Comets, a biography of Pluto-discoverer Clyde Tombaugh in 2006, and his tribute to Gene Shoemaker in Shoemaker by Levy. He has provided periodic articles for Sky and Telescope magazine, as well as Parade Magazine, Sky News and, most recently, Astronomy Magazine.

Periodic comets that Levy co-discovered include 118P/Shoemaker–Levy, 129P/Shoemaker–Levy, 135P/Shoemaker–Levy, 137P/Shoemaker–Levy, 138P/Shoemaker–Levy, 145P/Shoemaker–Levy, and 181P/Shoemaker–Levy. In addition, Levy is the sole discoverer of two periodic comets: 255P/Levy and P/1991 L3.

On February 28, 2011, Levy was awarded a Ph.D. from the Hebrew University of Jerusalem for his successful completion of his thesis "The Sky in Early Modern English Literature:  A Study of Allusions to Celestial Events in Elizabethan and Jacobean Writing, 1572–1620."

Starting in 2015, Levy has been donating his observing logs, which he has kept continuously since 1956, his personal journals since 1958, and his comet search records since 1965, to the Linda Hall Library of Science Library in Kansas City.  The observing records are also on-line at the website of the Royal Astronomical Society of Canada.

He lives in Vail, Arizona and is married to Wendee Levy. Levy and his wife hosted a weekly internet radio talk show on astronomy, which ended on February 3, 2011, with a planned "Final Show". Show archives are available in WMA and MP3 formats.  Levy is President of the National Sharing the Sky Foundation and a Master of Astronomy with DeTao Masters Academy (DTMA).

Levy's autobiography, "A Nightwatchman's journey:  the Road Not Taken" was published in June 2019 by the Royal Astronomical Society of Canada.

Awards 

The main-asteroid 3673 Levy was named in his honour. Levy was awarded the C.A. Chant Medal of the Royal Astronomical Society of Canada in 1980.  Levy was recipient of the 1990 G. Bruce Blair Medal. In 1993 he won the Amateur Achievement Award of the Astronomical Society of the Pacific. In 2007, Levy received the Smithsonian Astrophysical Observatory's Edgar Wilson Award for the discovery of comets. In 2008, a special edition telescope, "The Comet Hunter" was co-designed by Levy.

Together with Martyn Ives, David Taylor, and Benjamin Woolley, Levy won a 1998 News & Documentary Emmy Award in the "Individual Achievement in a Craft, Writer" category for the script of the documentary 3 Minutes to Impact produced by York Films for the Discovery Channel.

Discoveries

Comets 
Visual

 Comet Levy-Rudenko, 1984t, C/1984 V1, Nov 14, 1984
 Comet Levy, 1987a, C/1987 A1, January 5, 1987
 Comet Levy, 1987y, C/1987 T1,  October 11, 1987
 Comet Levy, 1988e, C/1988 F1,  March 19, 1988
 Comet Okazaki-Levy-Rudenko, 1989r, C/1989 Q1, August 25, 1989
 Comet Levy, 1990c, C/1990 K1,  May 20, 1990
 Periodic Comet Levy, P/1991 L3,  June 14, 1991
 Comet Takamizawa-Levy, C/1994 G1, April 15, 1994
 Periodic Comet 255P/Levy, October 2, 2006

Photographic, as part of team of Eugene and Carolyn Shoemaker and David Levy

 Periodic Comet Shoemaker-Levy 1, 1990o, P/1990 V1
 Periodic Comet Shoemaker-Levy 2, 1990p, 137 P/1990 UL3
 Comet Shoemaker-Levy, 1991d C/1991 B1
 Periodic Comet Shoemaker-Levy 3, 1991e, 129P/1991 C1
 Periodic Comet Shoemaker-Levy 4, 1991f, 118P/1991 C2
 Periodic Comet Shoemaker-Levy 5, 1991z, 145P/1991 T1
 Comet Shoemaker-Levy, 1991a1, C/1991 T2
 Periodic Comet Shoemaker-Levy 6, 1991b1, P/1991 V1
 Periodic Comet Shoemaker-Levy 7, 1991d1, 138P/1991 V2
 Periodic Comet Shoemaker-Levy 8, 1992f, 135P/1992 G2
 Periodic Comet Shoemaker–Levy 9, 1993e, D/1993 F2
 Comet Shoemaker-Levy, 1993h, C/1993 K1
 Comet Shoemaker-Levy, 1994d  C/1994 E2
 Comet Jarnac, P/2010 E2 (David Levy, Wendee Levy, Tom Glinos)

Other 
 Nova Cygni 1975, August 30, 1975 (independent discovery)
 Nova Cygni 1978, September 12, 1978 (independent discovery)
 Comet Hartley-IRAS (P/1983 V1), November 30, 1983 (independent discovery)
 Comet Shoemaker 1992y, C/1992 U1 (aided in discovery)
 Periodic Comet Shoemaker 4, 1994k, P/1994 J3 (aided in discovery)
 Asteroid (5261) Eureka, the first Martian Trojan asteroid, with Henry E. Holt, June 1990
 Established the cataclysmically recurring nature of  1215-17 TV Corvi (Tombaugh's Star), August 1990

Minor planets

See also 

 Carolyn S. Shoemaker
 Eugene Merle Shoemaker
 List of minor planet discoverers

References

External links 

 David Levy's Home Page

1948 births
20th-century Canadian astronomers
Acadia University alumni
Anglophone Quebec people
Jewish Canadian writers

Discoverers of asteroids
Discoverers of comets
Jewish Canadian scientists
Living people
Scientists from Montreal
Writers from Montreal
Queen's University at Kingston alumni
Hebrew University of Jerusalem alumni
Jewish astronomers